Jindřich Staněk (born 27 April 1996) is a Czech professional footballer who plays as a goalkeeper for Czech First League side Viktoria Plzeň and the Czech Republic.

Club career

Early career and time in England
Staněk started his career with Sparta Prague, appearing on the bench for the first team on three occasions in 2013. On 31 January 2014, he joined Premier League club Everton on a -year deal for an undisclosed fee. On 29 September 2015, Staněk joined Hyde United on a one-month loan deal, going on to make five appearances for the club. In June 2016, having made just two appearances on the bench for Everton, he was released by the club.

Return to the Czech Republic
In September 2016, Staněk joined Czech National Football League side Dynamo České Budějovice, having a loan spell with Třebíč in 2017. In January 2020, Staněk joined league rivals Viktoria Plzeň on loan.

International career
Staněk represented Czech Republic at every youth international level from under-16 to under-21.

Staněk made his debut for the Czech Republic national football team on 5 September 2021 in a World Cup qualifier against Belgium, a 0–3 away loss. He entered the game in the 12th minute for the injured Tomáš Vaclík, with the Czech Republic already down 0–1. He made his first senior start for his country in the 1–1 draw against Ukraine three days later.

References

Living people
1996 births
People from Strakonice
Association football goalkeepers
Czech footballers
Czech Republic youth international footballers
Czech First League players
Czech National Football League players
AC Sparta Prague players
Everton F.C. players
Hyde United F.C. players
SK Dynamo České Budějovice players
FC Viktoria Plzeň players
Expatriate footballers in England
Czech expatriate footballers
Czech expatriate sportspeople in England
Czech Republic under-21 international footballers
Czech Republic international footballers
Sportspeople from the South Bohemian Region